Busque is a surname. Notable people with the surname include: 

Leah Busque (born 1979), American entrepreneur
Melissa Busque (born 1990), Canadian footballer
Paul Busque, Canadian politician